Gado may refer to:

 Gado or gad, a short name for a gadolinium containing contrast dye often used in MRI medical imaging
 Gado (comics), Godfrey Mwampembwa, Kenyan political cartoonist
 Gado (Star Wars), a race in Star Wars
 Jadu, Libya, a town in northwestern Libya also known as Gado
 Gado or Ga-do, an island in North Korea
 Gado-gado, an Indonesian salad

See also
 Gato (disambiguation)
 Kado (disambiguation)

pt:Gado